The Uttarakhand Council of Ministers is the executive wing of Government of Uttarakhand and headed by Chief Minister of Uttarakhand, who is the head of government and leader of the state cabinet. The term of every executive wing is for 5 years. The council of ministers are assisted by department secretaries attached to each ministry who are from IAS Uttarakhand Cadre. The chief executive officer responsible for issuing orders on behalf of government is Chief Secretary to the state government. The current Chief Secretary is Dr. Sukhbir Singh Sindhu who took charge from outgoing Om Prakash.

Constitutional requirement

For the Council of Ministers to aid and advise Governor 
According to Article 163 of the Constitution of India,

This means that the Ministers serve under the pleasure of the Governor and he/she may remove them, on the advice of the Chief Minister, whenever they want.

For other provisions as to Ministers 
According to Article 164 of the Constitution of India,

Chief Minister 

Like any Indian state, Chief Ministers of Uttarakhand is the real head of the government and responsible for state administration. He is the leader of the parliamentary party in the legislature and heads the state cabinet. The current Chief Minister is Pushkar Singh Dhami.

State Cabinet 

As per the Constitution of India, all portfolios of state government is vested in Chief Minister, who distribute various portfolio to individual ministers whom he nominates to the State Governor. The state governor appoints individual ministers for various portfolios and departments as per advice of Chief Minister and together form the State Cabinet. As the original portfolios are vested with CM, who delegates to others upon his/her wish, actions of individual ministers are part of collective responsibility of the state cabinet and Chief Minister is responsible for actions of each minister. The state cabinet along with Chief Minister, prepares General policy and individual department policy, which will be guiding policy for day-to-day administration of each minister.

Current Cabinet
This is the current Cabinet of Uttarakhand headed by the Chief Minister of Uttarakhand, Pushkar Singh Dhami:

See also
 Governor of Uttarakhand
 Uttarakhand Legislative Assembly
 Speaker of the Uttarakhand Legislative Assembly
 Leader of the Opposition in the Uttarakhand Legislative Assembly
 Chief Justice of Uttarakhand
 Dhami ministry
 Tirath Singh Rawat ministry
 Trivendra Singh Rawat ministry
 Harish Rawat ministry
 Vijay Bahuguna ministry
 Second Khanduri ministry
 Pokhriyal ministry
 First Khanduri ministry
 Tiwari ministry
 Koshyari ministry
 Swami ministry
 Union Council of Ministers

References

Government of Uttarakhand
State council of ministers of India
2000 establishments in Uttarakhand
Cabinets established in 2000